ZOTAC is a computer hardware manufacturer founded and based in Hong Kong. The company specializes in producing video cards (GPUs), mini PCs, solid-state drives, motherboards, gaming computers and other computer accessories. All its products are manufactured in the PC Partner factories in Dongguan City, China.

Aside from its international headquarters in Hong Kong, it also has four offices overseas in Japan, South Korea, the United States, and Germany.

History 
ZOTAC was established in 2006 under the umbrella company of PC Partner. Its name was derived from the words "zone" and "tact". A year later, ZOTAC created its first ever video card, the ZOTAC GeForce 7300 GT.
In 2008, ZOTAC became the first hardware company to ship video cards with a factory overclock. In 2015, ZOTAC created a Steam Machine called the NEN. It featured a Nvidia GeForce 960 and an Intel Core i5-6400T Processor.

In 2016, The MAGNUS EN980 debuted at Computex Taipei. It was the first ever Mini PC that was considered "VR ready" by Nvidia, and it featured an Nvidia GTX 980 and an i5 Processor. Also launched is the smallest Mini PC line-up, P Series, and ZOTAC VR GO.

In 2017, Zotac released their GTX 1000 series line including their 1080, 1070, 1060, and also their miniseries including the GeForce GTX 1080 Ti Mini. They also introduced their new brand now known as 'Zotac Gaming'. The first product launched under it was the MEK Gaming PC, which was a Mini ITX desktop. In addition to the MEK Gaming PC and graphic cards, Zotac also released an external enclosure that supported Thunderbolt 3 and could host a graphic card up to nine inches long.

In 2018, Zotac announced their GeForce 20 series graphics cards including the GeForce RTX 2080 Ti, GeForce RTX 2080 series, and the GeForce RTX 2070 Series. In addition to graphic cards, Zotac also released their new line of ZBOX mini PCs in Q2 2018.

GeForce Series 
Zotac's GeForce series includes their slightly modified stock graphic cards and their own Amp! and Amp! Extreme products. Their Amp! and Amp! Extreme series are modified versions of NVIDIA's stock graphics cards that include a modified cooling system, advertised as quieter.

ZBox Mini PC Series 
Zotac's ZBox Mini PC Series includes USB 3.0, Wi-Fi, SD card slot, headphone and microphone ports, DVI, HDMI, DisplayPort, and a VGA port. The ZBox Mini PC Series is meant to be completely portable with ports to external displays.

In January 2019, the Mek Mini was revealed at CES.

See also 

 NVIDIA

References

External links 
 PC Partner website
 ZOTAC official website

Graphics hardware companies
Motherboard companies
Privately held companies
Computer hardware companies
Hong Kong brands